Ivor van Heerden holds a doctorate degree in Marine Sciences and was the deputy director of the Louisiana State University (LSU) Hurricane Center, before being dismissed by LSU with no reason given, following Hurricane Katrina. He is also the director of the Center for the Study of Public Health Impacts of Hurricanes.

Biography
Van Heerden was born in South Africa. He created a hurricane modeling program at LSU. For the last decade he has been one of the most persistent voices warning of the inevitable effects of a major hurricane on the Louisiana coast. He was one of several hundred participants at the Hurricane Pam exercise in July 2004. He claims that his warnings during the Hurricane Pam exercise were ignored, which may have contributed to the Hurricane Katrina disaster. He has also taken the United States Army Corps of Engineers (USACE) to task for their misdesigns which caused the Levee failures in Greater New Orleans, 2005. For a time LSU told him not to talk to the media, amid concerns that his book The Storm was endangering federal grant money flowing to the university.(The Storm, published in 2006, offered his analysis of Katrina and the levee disasters.)

On 9 April 2009 LSU announced it was firing van Heerden, effective the end of the spring semester 2010. Van Heerden said he was not offered any reason. Van Heerden spoke to Harry Shearer on his Le Show radio program on 12 April 2009 and said, "I learned about not being deputy director through the news media.  They basically didn't have the guts to tell me that to my face.... They couldn't tell me why and wouldn't tell me why."

A criticism from a retired corps employee was that van Heerden, a geologist, had allegedly offered "engineering services" or had represented himself "as an engineer publicly without having a professional engineer's license" and consequently was a legal liability for his employer, LSU.

Van Heerden was strongly defended in the Louisiana press. An especially tart assailment of LSU's administration appeared in the New Orleans Times-Picayune, from James A. Cobb Jr., attorney and adjunct professor in LSU-rival Tulane University's School of Law, whose letter to the editor ended thus: 
Academic freedom and intellectual integrity are, at LSU, like two distant cousins who haven't spoken to each other in many, many years. 
Flagship university? Please.

In an interview cited in the New York Times, van Heerden voiced suspicion that his "slow-motion" firing was timed to the opening—on Monday, April 20—of a multibillion-dollar civil suit in federal court against the USACE over the Mississippi River-Gulf Outlet Canal (MR-GO). The suit alleges the "short-cut" canal caused environmental degradation of the wetlands and greatly increased the effect of [Katrina], causing the flooding in such areas as St. Bernard Parish and the city’s Lower Ninth Ward. Dr. van Heerden is expected to testify in [the] case, and he said "I think that’s the timing — to try to discredit me."

On 10 February 2010, Dr. Van Heerden filed a wrongful termination lawsuit in Louisiana state court alleging that LSU officials waged a campaign of retaliation against him that culminated with the termination of his position with the university. He settled with the university shortly after embarrassing emails were made public. The emails traded between members of the Louisiana Governor’s office and LSU officials three weeks after Katrina revealed an apparent early plan to muzzle Dr. Ivor van Heerden when he blamed the Army Corps of Engineers for most of the New Orleans area flooding during Katrina. Dr. Van Heerden settled for $435,000. The university spent nearly a million dollars fighting the legal case.

Quotes

"What bothers me the most is all the people who've died unnecessarily."
"Those FEMA officials wouldn't listen to me. Those Corps of Engineers people giggled in the back of the room when we tried to present information."
When it was suggested that tents be prepared. "Their response to me was: 'Americans don't live in tents,' and that was about it."
"As a nation, let's take up the 'Rebuild!' battle cry.  Now is the time to put politics, egos, turf wars and profit agendas aside.  We owe it to the thirteen hundred Americans who died in the Katrina tragedy.  We owe it to their survivors and to all future generations.  It's now or never."

References

External links
Louisiana State University Hurricane Center
Suspect-Device

Living people
Year of birth missing (living people)
Louisiana State University faculty
American meteorologists
American science writers
South African emigrants to the United States